Edward J. "Ed" Withers (August 28, 1926 – April 17, 1975) was an American football player. He was born in Memphis, Tennessee, and moved to Madison, Wisconsin when he was a boy. He attended the University of Wisconsin-Madison and played college football for the Wisconsin Badgers football team. He was one of the first African-Americans to be a regular starter for the Badgers, playing at the defensive back position.  He was selected by the Football Writers Association of America as a first-team defensive player on their 1950 College Football All-America Team. Withers later worked as a teacher and coach at Roosevelt and North Division High Schools in Milwaukee and subsequently as an insurance salesman.  He died in Tomah, Wisconsin, in 1975 at age 48,  He was buried at Forest Hill Cemetery in Madison, Wisconsin.

References

1926 births
1975 deaths
Sportspeople from Madison, Wisconsin
Players of American football from Memphis, Tennessee
Players of American football from Wisconsin
African-American players of American football
American football defensive backs
Wisconsin Badgers football players
20th-century African-American sportspeople